The following units and commanders fought in the Battle of Blenheim during the War of the Spanish Succession on August 13, 1704.

Allied Army
Captain General John Churchill, 1st Duke of Marlborough
 Unless otherwise noted, all infantry units are composed of one battalion.

Blenheim Column

Centre
Lieutenant General Charles Churchill

Right, Army of Imperial Austria
Field Marshal Prince François Eugène von Savoy-Carignan

Franco-Bavarian Army
Camille d'Hostun de la Baume, Duc de Tallard, Marshal of France

Blenheim Wing Command
Lieutenant General Philippe, Marquis de Clérambault

Maréchal de Camp, the Marquis de Blansac

Between Blenheim and Oberglauheim
Marquis de Montpeyroux

The Army of the Elector of Bavaria
 
Prince Maximillian II Emmanuel Wittelsbach, Elector of Bavaria

Second in command: Marshal Ferdinand de Marsin

Marquis du Bourg's Corps
Lieutenant General the Marquis du Bourg

Marquis de Blainville's Corps
Lieutenant General Jean-Jules-Armand Colbert, Marquis de Blainville

Marquis de Rosel's Corps
Lieutenant General the Marquis de Rosel

Count d'Arco's Corps
Field Marshal Johann Baptist, Count d'Arco

Sources

 Higgins, David R. "Tactical File: The Famous Victory: Blenheim, 13 August 1704." Strategy & Tactics, Number 238 (September 2006).

Citations

War of the Spanish Succession orders of battle